{{DISPLAYTITLE:C6H12O}}
The molecular formula C6H12O may refer to:

 Cyclohexanol
 Cyclopentyl methyl ether
 Ethyl isopropyl ketone
 Hexanal
 2-Hexanone
 3-Hexanone
 cis-3-Hexen-1-ol
 Methyl isobutyl ketone
 3-Methyl-2-pentanone
 Oxepane
 Pinacolone